Scott Keeney (born 1964) is an American entrepreneur living in Vancouver, Washington.

Business career 

Scott Keeney is the founder of nLIGHT (2000) which manufactures high-power solid-state lasers. Before founding nLIGHT, he had been CEO of Aculight which was sold to Lockheed.  Previously Keeney had been a consultant at McKinsey & Company in San Francisco and Seattle.  Keeney began his career in manufacturing and quality management working with at Pacific Coast Feather Company.	
In 2007 Keeney was awarded the Outstanding Achievement Award from The Oregon Entrepreneurs Network  and in 2006 Keeney was a winner of the Ernst & Young Entrepreneur Of The Year® Pacific Northwest Award.

Education leadership 

Keeney is founder and chair for nConnect, an education non-profit focused on enhancing rigorous high school science and math programs.  In 2008, Keeney led an effort to expand nConnect and won a $13M grant from the National Math and Science Initiative.
This grant was later rescinded due to a conflict between grant requirements and the collective bargaining laws in the state of Washington.

References

External links 
 The Three Dimensions of a Great Team by Scott Keeney - Electro Optics
 Scott Keeney interview with SPIE - YouTube
 CEO: Trade Mission to India a Win-Win - The Columbian

1964 births
American chief executives of manufacturing companies
Businesspeople from Vancouver, Washington
Living people
Harvard Business School alumni